Franco José Fasciana Ordoñez (born 9 May 1990) is a footballer from Venezuela.

Fasciana played in the youth team with Monagas. In the year 2007 he played for UA Maracaibo, a team from the Primera División Venezolana. In June 2008 Barcelona contracted him.

References

1990 births
Living people
Venezuelan footballers
UA Maracaibo players
Association football midfielders
People from Barinas (state)
21st-century Venezuelan people